Nebelhorn may refer to:
Nebelhorn, mountain in Germany
Nebelhorn, California, community in El Dorado County
Nebelhorn Aerial Tramway
Nebelhorn Trophy